The Uis tin mine is a large open pit mine located in the western part of Namibia in Erongo Region. Uis represents one of the largest tin reserves in Namibia, having estimated reserves of 60 million tonnes of ore grading 0.13% tin. The mine is owned by the London-based AfriTin Mining Ltd..

References 

Tin mines in Namibia
Surface mines in Namibia